Herbert Heilpern (1919–1999) was a European born athlete and active builder of American soccer. He was inducted into the National Soccer Hall of Fame in 1988. 

Heilpern was born in Austria. After escaping Nazi occupied Europe, he played amateur soccer in New York City’s Eastern District League from 1939 to 1958 with the Bronx Jewish Soccer Club, Hakoah SC, and New World Club.  His Hakoah teams won championships in 1941-42 as did his New World Club in 1948-49.  He was coach of the 3rd Division Blue Star Soccer Club in the German-American Soccer League.  Heilpern was also President of the German-American Soccer League of New York 1969-75, and was a co-founder of both the North American Soccer League in 1967 and the New York Cosmos in 1971.  He joined the Executive Board of the German-American Junior League in 1976, and later served as President.  As Soccer Coordinator for the City of New York, he developed year-round soccer facilities in the southern part of the state. He was named First Vice President of the Eastern New York Youth Soccer Association in 1985. Before emigrating from Austria in 1939, Heilpern was a goalkeeper for the Hakoah club of Vienna.

References

1919 births
1999 deaths
Austrian footballers
German-American Soccer League
North American Soccer League (1968–1984) executives
New York Cosmos
National Soccer Hall of Fame members
Place of birth missing
Association football goalkeepers
Austrian emigrants to the United States